The 2019–20 Missouri Tigers men's basketball team represented the University of Missouri in the 2019–20 NCAA Division I men's basketball season and was led by head coach Cuonzo Martin, who was in his third year at Missouri. The team played its home games at Mizzou Arena in Columbia, Missouri as eighth-year members of the Southeastern Conference. They finished the season 15–16, 7–11 in SEC play to finish in a tie for tenth place. They were set to take on Texas A&M in the second round of the SEC tournament. However, the SEC Tournament was cancelled amid the COVID-19 pandemic.

Previous season
The Tigers finished the 2018–19 season 15–17, 5–13 in SEC play to finish in 12th place. As the No. 12 seed in the SEC tournament, they defeated the Georgia Bulldogs in the first round 71–61. Missouri would lose in the second round to the number five seed Auburn. The Tigers did not receive an at-large bid or earn an automatic-bid to the NCAA tournament.

Departures

2019 recruiting class

Incoming Transfers

Preseason

SEC media poll
The SEC media poll was released on October 15, 2019.

Roster

On January 11, 2020, Martin announced that the Tigers had suspended freshman Mario McKinney indefinitely for unspecified reasons.

Schedule and results

|-
!colspan=12 style=|Exhibition

|-
!colspan=12 style=|Regular season

|-
!colspan=12 style=| SEC tournament
|- style="background:#bbbbbb"
| style="text-align:center"|March 12, 20206:00 pm, SECN
| style="text-align:center"| (10)
| vs. (7) Texas A&MSecond round
| colspan=5 rowspan=1 style="text-align:center"|Cancelled due to the COVID-19 pandemic
| style="text-align:center"|Bridgestone ArenaNashville, TN
|-

Rankings

*AP does not release post-NCAA Tournament rankings

References

Missouri
Missouri Tigers men's basketball seasons
Missouri Tigers men's basketball
Missouri Tigers men's basketball